Hirokazu Yasuda (安田 寛一, born May 31, 1936) is a retired Japanese hurdler who competed at the 1964 Olympics. He won two bronze medals in the 110 m hurdles at the Asian Games.

References

1936 births
Living people
Japanese male sprinters
Olympic male sprinters
Olympic athletes of Japan
Athletes (track and field) at the 1964 Summer Olympics
Asian Games bronze medalists for Japan
Asian Games medalists in athletics (track and field)
Athletes (track and field) at the 1958 Asian Games
Athletes (track and field) at the 1962 Asian Games
Medalists at the 1958 Asian Games
Medalists at the 1962 Asian Games
Japan Championships in Athletics winners